Wesley Tavares dos Santos (born 21 January 1991), known as Wesley Santos or simply Wesley, is a Brazilian retired footballer who played as a left back.

Club career
Born in São Vicente, São Paulo, Wesley Santos was a Santos youth graduate. On 14 February 2010, after helping the under-20 side finish runner-up in the Copa São Paulo de Futebol Júnior, he made his debut with the main squad by starting in a 2–1 Campeonato Paulista home win against Rio Claro.

Ahead of the 2011 season, WWesley Santos as loaned to Campeonato Paulista Série A3 side Sport Barueri. After featuring sparingly, he returned to Peixe and made his Série A debut on 17 July of that year, starting in a 2–1 home defeat of Atlético Mineiro.

Wesley Santos failed to make any further appearances for the club, being subsequently loaned to Rio Verde and Portuguesa Santista for the 2012 campaign. On 17 May 2013, he joined Jabaquara after his contract with Santos expired.

Wesley Santos signed for Guarany de Sobral for the 2014 season, but was released on 15 August. He also represented CENE before returning to Jabaquara in 2016.

In June 2016, Wesley Santos agreed to a move to American club Las Vegas City FC, but the move never materialized. In September, he agreed to a deal with FC Cubillas in the Spanish Primera Andaluza.

Career statistics

References

External links

1991 births
Living people
People from São Vicente, São Paulo
Brazilian footballers
Association football defenders
Campeonato Brasileiro Série A players
Campeonato Brasileiro Série D players
Santos FC players
Associação Atlética Portuguesa (Santos) players
Jabaquara Atlético Clube players
Guarany Sporting Club players
Divisiones Regionales de Fútbol players
Brazilian expatriate footballers
Brazilian expatriate sportspeople in Spain
Expatriate footballers in Spain
Footballers from São Paulo (state)